Architect John Ariss (sometimes spelled Ayres) (1725–1799) was born in Westmoreland County, Virginia to a family long settled in the Old Dominion. Two of his works have been classified as National Historic Landmarks. A rare surviving, documented example of his work is Traveller's Rest in Kearneysville, West Virginia, which he designed as a farmstead home for American Revolutionary War General Horatio Gates. He is also believed to have designed the Neo-Palladian estate Mount Airy, located in Richmond County, Virginia on Virginia's Northern Neck.

Ariss was born in Westmoreland County in 1725, but by 1743 his father was dead and Ariss apparently chose his brother Spencer Ariss as his guardian. Subsequently, Ariss may have been sent to England for schooling because his return from England is noted in 1751. In 1755, Ariss moved to nearby Richmond County, and in 1767 he moved, this time to Fauquier County. Ariss was a longtime friend of General George Washington, to whom he rented his home. Some also believe that Ariss had a role in designing the Washington home at Mount Vernon.

The relationship between the two families was of long standing: Ariss was the great-grandson of Col. Nicholas Spencer of Cople Parish, Westmoreland, who had patented the Mount Vernon estate with his friend Lt. Col. John Washington.

A number of Ariss's works are listed on the U.S. National Register of Historic Places (NRHP).

Works
Elmwood (built 1774), SW of jct. of Rtes. 640 and U.S. 17 Loretto, VA, NRHP-listed
Fairfield, E of jct. of Rtes. 340 and 610 Berryville, VA, NRHP-listed
Lamb's Creek Church, VA 607 Sealston, VA, NRHP-listed
Little England, E of Gloucester on VA 672 Gloucester, VA, NRHP-listed
Little Fork Church, jct. of Rtes. 624 and 726 Rixeyville, VA, NRHP-listed
Menokin, NW of jct. of Rtes. 690 and 621 Warsaw, VA, NRHP-listed
Mount Airy, W of Warsaw on U.S. 360 Warsaw, VA, NRHP-listed
Harewood (West Virginia), designed in 1770 for Samuel Washington, NRHP-listed

See also
Harewood (West Virginia)

References

1725 births
1799 deaths
People from Westmoreland County, Virginia
Virginia colonial people
18th-century American architects